Dinar (Celaenae-Apamea) is a town of Afyonkarahisar Province in the Aegean region of Turkey, 106 km from the city of Afyon. It is the seat of Dinar District. Its population is 26,300 (2021). The mayor is Saffet Acar (MHP).

The town is built amidst the ruins of Celaenae-Apamea, near the sources of the Büyük Menderes (Maeander) river. In ancient mythology this was the site of the musical duel between Apollo and Marsyas.

Dinar today is a small town in a rural area, with limited amenities, particularly since there was a large earthquake here in 1995, which caused many people to migrate away from the town. Dinar is a crossroads on journeys from Ankara or Istanbul to Antalya, motorists wouldn't stop here but many trucks do need to.

The folk culture of Dinar is rich, the town granted many well-known folk-songs (türkü in Turkish).

History
From 1867 until 1922, Dinar was part of the Hüdavendigâr vilayet of the Ottoman Empire.

References

External links
 Afyonkarahisar Dinar
 Afyon Governorship - Dinar District 

Populated places in Afyonkarahisar Province
Towns in Turkey
Dinar District